Jerusalem's Lot, Maine (often shortened to 'Salem's Lot or just the Lot) is a fictional town and a part of writer Stephen King's fictional Maine topography. 'Salem's Lot has served as the setting for a number of his novels, novellas, and short stories. It first appeared in King's 1975 novel 'Salem's Lot, and has reappeared as late as his 2019 novel The Institute (see list below).  The town is described as being located in Cumberland County, between (or including parts of) the towns of Falmouth, Windham, and Cumberland, near the southern part of the state about 10 miles north of Portland. A map on King's official website, though, places 'Salem's Lot considerably further north, approximately in Northwest Piscataquis.

King, a native of Durham, Maine, created a trinity of fictional Maine towns – Jerusalem's Lot, Castle Rock and Derry – as central settings in more than one work.

Origin and inspiration
In Danse Macabre, King's non-fiction, semi-autobiographical review of horror in all media forms, King confesses that 'Salem's Lot was largely derived from the town of Durham, Maine; specifically the area in which he resided as a youth known locally as "Methodist Corners." The Marsten House of Salem's Lot was based upon a vacant house of the same name in Methodist Corners; he and his friends had explored the real Marsten House as children.

Besides the oft-used trinity of Jerusalem's Lot, Castle Rock, and Derry, King has created other fictional Maine towns, including Chamberlain in Carrie, Ludlow in Pet Sematary and The Dark Half (unrelated to the real Maine town of Ludlow), Haven in The Tommyknockers, Little Tall Island in Dolores Claiborne, Storm of the Century and "Morning Deliveries" (the last of which appeared in the book of short stories called Skeleton Crew), and Chester's Mill in Under the Dome.

Fictional history and myth
The town that would become Jerusalem's Lot was founded in 1710 by a preacher named James Boon, the leader of a cult of schismatic Puritans. The cult became notorious in the region for its open embrace of witchcraft and for its amoral sexual practices, including inbreeding. Jerusalem's Lot became an incorporated town in 1765, but was abandoned in 1789 after Boon and his followers mysteriously vanished. The mass disappearance occurred not long after Philip Boone, a wealthy individual and unknowing descendant of James Boon, obtained an occultic book known as De Vermis Mysteriis; Philip Boone disappeared along with the rest of the village.

When Jerusalem's Lot was incorporated in 1765, Maine was still part of the Massachusetts Bay Colony. The town got its name from a myth about one of the earliest residents, Charles Belknap Tanner, who raised pigs; one of these pigs was named Jerusalem. One day, Jerusalem escaped from her confines into a nearby forest, and became aggressive and wild. Tanner began warning young children who trespassed on his property to "Keep 'ee out o' Jerusalem's wood lot," lest the pig devour them. Eventually, the phrase "Jerusalem's Lot" was adopted as the town name.

At an unknown date sometime after Boone and McCann's exploration, people began inhabiting the town again.  The town had a representative named Elias Jointner in the House of Representatives by 1896. As chronicled in the novel 'Salem's Lot, Jerusalem's Lot has been identified as a residence for great and mysterious evil, particularly vampires.

Literary works set in Jerusalem's Lot

Works that reference Jerusalem's Lot

Television 
Jerusalem's Lot appears in episode eight of the King-produced 2018 Hulu web television series Castle Rock. Henry Deaver's son Wendell takes a bus to Jerusalem's Lot after being sent away from Castle Rock by his father. A traffic sign in the episode indicated that the town was located 24 miles from Castle Rock. The town is the central setting of the second season of the series.

The 2021 Epix television series Chapelwaite, starring Adrien Brody and Emily Hampshire, is based on the short story "Jerusalem's Lot" and novel 'Salem's Lot.

References

'Salem's Lot
Cthulhu Mythos locations
Fictional populated places in Maine
Fictional populated places created by Stephen King
Castle Rock (franchise)
Fictional elements introduced in 1975